The 2018–19 Minnesota Wild season was the 19th season for the National Hockey League franchise that was established on June 25, 1997. On April 2, 2019, the Wild were eliminated from playoff contention after the Colorado Avalanche's 6–2 victory against the Edmonton Oilers, marking the first time the Wild missed the postseason since the 2011–12 season.

Standings

Schedule and results

Preseason
The preseason schedule was published on June 13, 2018.

Regular season
The regular season schedule was released on June 21, 2018.

Player statistics
As of April 6, 2019

Skaters

Goaltenders

†Denotes player spent time with another team before joining the Wild. Stats reflect time with the Wild only.
‡Denotes player was traded mid-season. Stats reflect time with the Wild only.
Bold/italics denotes franchise record.

Awards and honours

Milestones

Transactions
The Wild have been involved in the following transactions during the 2018–19 season.

Trades

Free agents

Waivers

Contract terminations

Signings

Draft picks

Below are the Minnesota Wild's selections at the 2018 NHL Entry Draft, which was held on June 22 and 23, 2018, at the American Airlines Center in Dallas, Texas.

Notes:
 The Buffalo Sabres' third-round pick went to the Minnesota Wild as the result of a trade on June 30, 2017, that sent Jason Pominville, Marco Scandella and a fourth-round pick in 2018 to Buffalo in exchange for Tyler Ennis, Marcus Foligno and this pick.
 The Vegas Golden Knights' third-round pick went to the Minnesota Wild as the result of a trade on June 21, 2017, that sent Alex Tuch to Vegas in exchange for this pick (being conditional at the time of the trade).
 The Washington Capitals' fifth-round pick went to the Minnesota Wild as the result of a trade on June 14, 2017, that sent Tyler Graovac to Washington in exchange for this pick.

References

Minnesota Wild seasons
Minnesota Wild
Minnesota Wild
Minnesota Wild